Calder Valley is a constituency in West Yorkshire represented in the House of Commons of the UK Parliament since 2010 by Craig Whittaker, a Conservative.

Constituency profile
The constituency covers most of the upland metropolitan district of Calderdale in West Yorkshire, including the town of Todmorden which was formerly split in half between Lancashire and Yorkshire. Hebden Bridge and Todmorden are known for their bohemian culture and are more Labour-leaning, whereas Elland and Brighouse tend to vote Conservative, making the seat marginal overall.

Boundaries 

Since the constituency's creation in 1983 it has comprised the Metropolitan Borough of Calderdale wards of Brighouse, Calder, Elland, Greetland and Stainland, Hipperholme and Lightcliffe, Luddendenfoot, Rastrick, Ryburn, and Todmorden.

History 
The constituency was created in 1983, primarily from the former seat of Sowerby as well as parts of Brighouse and Spenborough. Historically a bellwether seat between Labour and the Conservatives, at the 2010 general election the seat became the closest three-way marginal in the north of England, with less than 1,000 votes between the Labour candidate in second place and the Liberal Democrat candidate in third, although with a significant Conservative majority. The seat's three-way marginal status did not last; the Labour vote increased significantly in both 2015 and 2017 while the Liberal Democrat vote collapsed dramatically over the same period. The seat has followed national trends, albeit with a disadvantage to the Conservatives when compared to the national swing, and is still considered a bellwether seat.

Members of Parliament

Elections

Elections in the 2010s

Elections in the 2000s 
:

Elections in the 1990s

Elections in the 1980s

See also 
 List of parliamentary constituencies in West Yorkshire

Notes

References

Sources
Calder Valley Election Forum

External links 
nomis Constituency Profile for Calder Valley — presenting data from the ONS annual population survey and other official statistics.

Parliamentary constituencies in Yorkshire and the Humber
Politics of Calderdale
Constituencies of the Parliament of the United Kingdom established in 1983